The Pisueña River is located at northern Spain, in the area known as Green Spain. It flows through the autonomous community of Cantabria, and it is tributary to the Pas.

See also 
 List of rivers of Spain

Rivers of Spain
Rivers of Cantabria